The Gospel Standard is a Strict Baptist monthly magazine first published in 1835 by William Gadsby. It is the tenth oldest monthly magazine still in print in the British Isles.

Many Strict Baptist churches are affiliated with and recognised by the publishers of the Gospel Standard. Churches which align themselves with the magazine are known as "Gospel Standard Baptists" or "Gospel Standard Strict Baptists".

References

Further reading

External links
 

Christian magazines
Reformed Baptists
Magazines established in 1835
Religious magazines published in the United Kingdom